Farfantepenaeus notialis is a species of marine crustacean in the family Penaeidae.

Distribution
It is found off the east coast of South America from Yucatan, Mexico to Rio de Janeiro, Brazil, and the west coast of Africa, from Mauritania to Angola.

Description

Fishery
F. notialis and Litopenaeus schmitti are together the most important prawn species in an area extending from the Greater Antilles to Venezuela.

Taxonomy
F. notialis was first described as a subspecies of "Penaeus duorarum" (now Farfantepenaeus duorarum) by Isabel Pérez Farfante in 1967, before being recognised as a separate species. Both species have since been reassigned to the genus Farfantepenaeus. The common name preferred by the Food and Agriculture Organization is southern pink shrimp, but the species is also known as candied shrimp in the United States.

References

Penaeidae
Crustaceans of the Atlantic Ocean
Crustaceans described in 1967